Richard Tyner (1 October 1877 – 6 April 1958) was an Irish Anglican bishop.

Richard Styner was born in Castlepollard, County Westmeath, Ireland and educated at Trinity College, Dublin. He was ordained in 1910. He was a curate at St Cyllin Monaghan and then held incumbencies at Clontibret, Ematris and Rockcorry. He was appointed the 52nd Bishop of Clogher in 1943 And served until 1958. He died in Monaghan, aged 80.

References

1877 births
1958 deaths
Alumni of Trinity College Dublin
20th-century Anglican bishops in Ireland
Bishops of Clogher (Church of Ireland)
People from County Westmeath